AlityPC is a Hong Kong technology company that designs and develops technology products for the home. Their products include digital photo frames and high-tech lifestyle gadgets.

The Pixxa model of photo frame features a clock and calendar, a mirrored surface when photos are not being displayed, and a touch-screen user interface.

AlityPC also developed the first patented Wi-Fi digital photo frame with peer to peer communication protocol. Most Wi-Fi Photo Frames available in the market now are one way downstream. With AlityPC's Peer to Peer integration, it allows the product to be more interactive. Users can send photo messages to the photo frame via the Internet similar most IM application in the market. It can also synchronize with Google calendar and download live news.

Ality Online is an online service provide by AlityPC, it's the central portal for friends and family to send photo messages and greeting cards to Wireless Pixxa owners. Users can invite their friends and family to join Ality Online with no service charge. Photo Frame owner can also customize their online photo frame setting, for example, Google Calendar, Flickr, Picasa, Stock and live news.

AlityPC also developed the slimmest LCD photo Frame in the world, Pixxa Slim.

References

External links 
Ality Global Website
 Ality Online Web Service

Technology companies of Hong Kong
Companies established in 2005